Penfield Township is one of the eighteen townships of Lorain County, Ohio, United States. As of the 2010 census the population was 1,789.

Geography
Located in southeastern Lorain County, it borders the following townships:
LaGrange Township - north
Grafton Township - northeast corner
Litchfield Township, Medina County - east
Chatham Township, Medina County - southeast corner
Spencer Township, Medina County - south
Huntington Township - southwest corner
Wellington Township - west
Pittsfield Township - northwest corner

No municipalities are located in Penfield Township.

Name and history
Penfield Township was established in 1820 and named in honor of Peter Penfield, an early settler. It is the only Penfield Township statewide.

Government
The township is governed by a three-member board of trustees, who are elected in November of odd-numbered years to a four-year term beginning on the following January 1. Two are elected in the year after the presidential election and one is elected in the year before it. There is also an elected township fiscal officer, who serves a four-year term beginning on April 1 of the year after the election, which is held in November of the year before the presidential election. Vacancies in the fiscal officership or on the board of trustees are filled by the remaining trustees.

References

External links

County website

Townships in Lorain County, Ohio
Townships in Ohio